Bagh Kandi (also Romanized as Bāgh Kandī, Bāgh-i-Kandi, and Bag-Kendi) is a village in Ijrud-e Bala Rural District, in the Central District of Ijrud County, Zanjan Province, Iran. At the 2006 census, its population was 265, in 75 families.

References 

Populated places in Ijrud County